Dust Mohammad (also Romanized as Dūst Moḩammad; also known as Dūst Moḩammad Khān) is a town in and the capital of Hirmand County, Sistan and Baluchestan Province, Iran. At the 2006 census, its population was 6,902, in 1,328 families.

References

Populated places in Hirmand County

Cities in Sistan and Baluchestan Province